Azel, proper name, may refer to:

Azel: Panzer Dragoon RPG, a 1998 video game
A descendant of Saul (I Chronicles 8:37; I Chronicles 9:43-44) Books of Chronicles
A variant spelling of Azal, a place name referred to in Zechariah 14:5 Book of Zechariah
One of the Four Devas, the Primary Antagonists of God Hand
AzEl or Az-El may also refer to:

A type of Antenna Rotator mounting (diminutive for Azimuth/Elevation)
 Azel (album)